Babbitt, Nevada, was a populated place established as a 1941 government housing facility for workers of the neighboring Hawthorne Naval Ammunition Depot.  Subsequently, used as a Cold War radar station (Hawthorne Bomb Plot), remaining town structures include the school building at the intersection of 21st Street and Yorktown Avenue and numerous concrete building foundations.  An RV park is located at the east side of the former community.

World War II
The Babbitt housing development for civilian civil service workers was the largest World War II housing project for the depot, cf. a Naval Battalion facility for 2000 sailors, Camp Jumbo for single men at a former CCC camp, a Construction Camp adjacent to Jumbo, and a trailer park near Hawthorne.  The first phase of Babbitt was 25 duplex units on a single block built in 1941 which was followed by 400 duplexes in 1942 and 487 by 1943. By the final stage of duplex construction, Babbitt encompassed approximately 40 blocks and 584 duplexes by the end of World War II.  All duplexes were on the same 10 room plan, with 4 bedrooms, 2 bathrooms, 2 kitchens, and two living rooms. Varying arrangements allowed for one, two, and three bedroom single units. A small number of duplexes were converted into four bedroom single units in postwar years.

West to East avenues were named for aircraft carriers, including Essex, Lexington, Wasp, Ranger, Saratoga, Yorktown, Hornet, Enterprise, and Langley Avenues. North to South streets were numbered from 10th to 30th. The first street with housing on it was 11th (Hawthorne, Nevada, had 1st through 10th streets).

Korean War
Additional structures (Title III) built during the Korean War were 65 two bedroom and 35 three bedroom single family units in the western corner along the Z shaped Dahlgren Drive to which three other drives connected, Jones, Dewey, and Perry; all named for U.S. Navy figures.  Babbitt housing peaked at ~2590 bedrooms .

By 1954, 3 duplexes had been removed, and one duplex was moved to another location to serve as a community center for the segregated African American part of the community.

Segregation
Until the Civil Rights Act of 1964, Babbitt housing was segregated by a three block long gap of approximately 150 feet between 26th and 27th Streets separating the area housing African-American workers and their families ("Colored Town" colloq.).

The movie theater, the bowling alley, and the soda fountain at Johnson's Pharmacy were also segregated.   The Navy constructed a small building used as the "BBQ Pit" business at the edge of the Colored Town, and adjacent was a relocated duplex operated as a segregated community center.  Businesses not allowing African-American customers included The El Capitan casino, the Three Rs restaurant and the Home Cafe. Only one bar, owned and operated by African Americans, served them during the 1950s.  The NAACP organized sit-ins and demonstrations, and efforts by Governor Sawyer failed to open the casino to African-American customers.  As late as 1970, minorities in Babbitt were integrated into the community.

In the post-Korean War drawdown, sections of Babbitt were closed off and after some buildings were sold and moved away, 171 duplexes and 51 single units were gone by the early 1960s.  Strategic Air Command opened a radar station within Babbitt -1985 and after transfer to the Navy, the "Navy Fallon RBS" operated through .

By 1970 an additional 114 duplexes had been moved out, and in the 1970s and 1980s, additional sections were closed and dismantled.  The last residents left in 1987, and only a school and a bowling alley remained in operation for some years afterwards.  In 2004 the Whiskey Flats RV park was established roughly in the former location of the radar station.

References 

Former populated places in Mineral County, Nevada
Company towns in Nevada
African-American segregation in the United States
Hawthorne, Nevada
History of Mineral County, Nevada
History of racial segregation in the United States
Military installations in Nevada
United States home front during World War II
1940s in Nevada
1941 establishments in Nevada
1988 disestablishments in Nevada
Populated places established in 1941